Demetria Hester (born ) is a Black activist, speaker, and hate crime survivor based in Portland, Oregon. She is a frequent organizer of and speaker at Portland's George Floyd protests, Black Lives Matter rallies, and vigils for victims of police violence.

Early life and education 
Demetria Hester moved from Tennessee to the Pacific Northwest searching for a fresh start for herself and her two children. She first moved to Washington state, then to Portland in 2014. She has worked at a restaurant, studied at the Art Institute of Portland and become a sous chef. Hester is fond of the cartoon character SpongeBob SquarePants.

Surviving a racist attack 
Hester survived a verbal and physical assault by white supremacist and murderer Jeremy Joseph Christian on 25 May 2017, while waiting for the light-rail train in Portland. Hester claims police did not take her seriously when they responded to the incident. The next day, Christian fatally stabbed two men and injured a third on a different train in what is known as the 2017 Portland train attack. Hester testified against Christian at his trial.

Activism and arrest 
Hester became a visible leader during the 2020 summer-long George Floyd Protests, and is a founder and lead organizer of Moms United for Black Lives, a group that participates in protests to end police violence against Black people. This group is led by a collective of Black women, including Don't Shoot Portland’s founder Teressa Raiford and Danialle James.

Hester was arrested at the George Floyd Protests in early on 10 August 2020, booked on suspicion of disorderly conduct and interfering with a police officer, and held in the Multnomah County Jail. Later, Multnomah County District Attorney Mike Schmidt declined to prosecute Hester and other protesters who were charged with small nonviolent offenses. All charges have been dropped.

Hester led a group from Moms United for Black Lives to Washington, D.C. on January 20, 2020, for Martin Luther King Day, an occasion which she called a "beautiful and epic moment in history."

References 

Living people
Civil rights protests in the United States
Black Lives Matter people
George Floyd protests in Portland, Oregon
1974 births
Activists from Portland, Oregon